Qaleh-ye Ali (also Romanized as Qal‘eh-ye ‘Ālī and Qal‘eh-ye ‘Alī; also known as ‘Ālī) is a village in Shesh Pir Rural District, Hamaijan District, Sepidan County, Fars Province, Iran. At the 2006 census, its population was 58, in 12 families.

References 

Populated places in Sepidan County